Changsha WES Academy is an international kindergarten, elementary and secondary school located in Changsha, Hunan Province, People's Republic of China.

Changsha WES Academy (CWA) is approved by the Ministry of Education as an international school that teaches in English.

CWA was established in 2009 by the Changsha Economic and Technical Development Zone Administrative Committee (CETZAC) in co-operation with Worldwide Education Services Group Pte. Ltd. (WES Group) to provide an international education for the children of expatriate and SAR families living and working in the area.

CWA began classes on September 1, 2010, with only four students aged 7 to 9. The Early Years Programme began on February 14, 2011, with ten children aged three to five. Currently, approximately 100 students representing 17 nationalities are enrolled in classes ranging from Nursery to Grade 12.

Curriculum 

The school is an IB World School authorized by the International Baccalaureate Organisation (IB) to offer the Primary Years Programme (PYP). CWA is a Cambridge International Examinations (CIE) centre, offering International General Certificate of Secondary Education (IGCSE) as well as Cambridge International AS & A Level courses and examinations. In addition, CWA is accredited by the Council of International Schools.

See also

References

External links 
Changsha WES Academy
Changsha WES Academy 

Education in Changsha
International schools in China
International Baccalaureate schools in China
Cambridge schools in China
Educational institutions established in 2010
2010 establishments in China